Komatsubara (small pine field) is a Japanese surname.

Notable people with this surname include:
 Kazuo Komatsubara (一男 or 一夫, 1943–2000), Japanese animator
 Manabu Komatsubara (学, born 1981), Japanese footballer
 Michitarō Komatsubara (道太郎, 1885–1940), Japanese general
 Misato Komatsubara (美里, born 1992), Japanese ice dancer
 Mitsugu Komatsubara (貢 or 女貢, born 1953), Japanese reporter and amateur astronomer
 9103 Komatsubara, main-belt asteroid named after Mitsugu Komatsubara
 Mitsuo Komatsubara (三夫, 1920–2013), Japanese golfer
 Shigeru Komatsubara (茂, born 1949), Japanese cinematographer

References 

Japanese-language surnames